Nightlight Christian Adoptions is a national, non-profit, Hague-accredited, pro-life licensed adoption agency that counsels pregnant women and arranges adoptions. They have locations in ten U.S. states and arrange adoptions both domestically and internationally. The agency was founded in 1959. Nightlight was the first agency beginning in 1995 to organize a tour of the United States by group of orphaned Russian children. In 1997, the agency created the first program in the United States to arrange for couples to adopt frozen embryos.

Founding and purpose 

Nightlight is a licensed non-profit Hague accredited adoption agency that provides pro-life counseling to pregnant women and adoption services to families. They coordinate adoptions both in the United States and internationally. They also facilitate adoption of frozen embryos and provide humanitarian assistance to children in orphanages.

Nightlight was founded in 1959 by a group of evangelical Christian churches with the purpose of addressing the needs of women in unplanned pregnancy. At the time, the name of the agency was Evangelical Welfare Agency. The agency was later called Christian Adoption and Family Services. In 1994, Ron Stoddart, a California adoption attorney, assumed leadership.

The agency changed its name to Nightlight Christian Adoptions and has offices in multiple states. It arranges adoptions within the United States and from twelve foreign countries. In 1995 Nightlight was the first agency to bring a group of Russian orphan children to the United States on a tour to help increase awareness of older children's adoption needs.

Daniel Nehrbass became Executive Director in May 2012.

Adoptions

International adoptions 

Nightlight has been involved in international adoptions in multiple countries.  The organization has successfully helped over 1000 families adopt children from countries overseas, with the largest number coming from Russia. Fees for an international adoption can be as much as $49,000. To help adoptive families, the company "created a $50,000 scholarship fund. The monies are available to help prospective adopting parents wanting to adopt eligible children; but who may not have the financial resources available to do so."

Some adoptees express their gratitude for the success they have found in their new homes. Oleg Parent was rescued from a dangerous home in Russia. He became a star football player in his high school and tattooed his adoptive mother's name on his calf.

Adoption issues 
In an example of an adoption that went badly, a 12-year-old Russian child, abandoned as a baby by her prostitute mother, was adopted in 1997 by a Michigan couple, Priscilla and Neal Whatcott. The Whatcotts alleged that Nightlight did not tell them that the child had problems but, when the child became unmanageable, referred them to a therapist who also had adopted a Russian girl. The girl was extremely difficult to parent and was eventually surrendered to the state. Nightlight has since said that families and organizations who are involved in international adoptions now recognize "the need for post-adoption support."

Native American adoption 

In 2009, Nightlight was contacted by Christina Maldonado who wanted to place her unborn child for adoption. Maldonado had been engaged to Dusten Brown in December 2008, and she became pregnant in January 2009. Brown asked her to married him sooner than they had planned, but he refused to provide any support until they were married. Maldonado decided to put the child up for adoption.

The Indian Child Welfare Act requires that the tribe must be notified when a Native American child is adopted outside the tribe. Maldonado thought that Brown might be a Cherokee Indian, and Maldanado's attorney contacted the Cherokee Nation to determine whether he was an enrolled member, but their letter misspelled Brown's name and provided an incorrect date of birth. As a result, the tribe could not verify if Brown was formally enrolled and took no action on the pending adoption.

The agency helped Maldonado to arrange for Matt and Melanie Capobianco of South Carolina to adopt her child. Four months later the Capobianco's attorney notified them that the biological father was seeking custody. Attorneys for the Cherokee Nation got involved a few months later. Maldonado's attorneys later argued that she did know he was a Native American and that he had never invited her to take part in tribal customs, events, or food. Brown and his new wife gained custody of the infant.

Court records show that Brown had previously testified that he was willing to surrender his paternal rights if he "would not be responsible in any way for child support or anything else as far as the child's concerned."  The case went to the United States Supreme Court which ruled against Brown. A South Carolina court finalized the adoption and the Oklahoma Supreme Court ruled on September 23, 2013, that it did not have jurisdiction over Veronica. Brown and his wife returned Veronica to her adoptive parents on September 24.

Embryo adoption program 

In vitro fertilization has become an increasingly popular choice for infertile couples. The process harvests a donor woman's eggs which are then fertilized in a laboratory using a donor male's sperm. Fertile embryos are then implanted in the woman who will carry the embryo to term. But the process results in a number of fertile embryos that are never used. Couples have the choice to allow them to thaw and perish, allow the eggs to be used for research, donate them to another infertile couple, or keep them in cold storage. It costs up to $1,200 a year to store frozen embryos.

The Catholic Church has stated that frozen embryos have a right to life even before they are implanted in a woman's uterus. It opposes in vitro fertilization but it has not issued a formal statement on embryo adoption, although it discourages the practice due to its close connection to in vitro fertilization.

Individuals have differing opinions about the beginning of human personhood and whether the embryos have the potential to become a person. Stoddart and Nightlight believe that life begins when the embryo is created.  According to a survey by the American Society for Reproductive Medicine, 54% of fertility patients want to preserve their remaining embryos for future use. Another 21% want to donate leftover embryos for research. Donating embryos for research may be a good alternative when patients receive proper, honest and clear information about the research project, the procedures and the scientific value of the research. The remaining 7% of those surveyed are willing to donate leftover embryos to another couple.

Dr. Jeffrey Nelson is Director of the Huntington Reproductive Center, one of California's largest IVF clinics. He reports that "Twenty-five per cent of patients want to donate their [spare] embryos – not as many as I'd like." He added, "People tend to hold on to their embryos because they don't want to make a decision. We started buying more and more cryopreservation tanks, and we finally had to say that there's a fee for a certain number of years' storage, and beyond that the price starts to escalate." As of May 2012, there were about 600,000 frozen embryos stored in laboratories and fertility clinics, costing the donor families about $72 million annually for storage fees.

Origins 

In 1997, after Stoddart heard a radio show talking about British frozen embryos being destroyed, Nightlight established an embryo "adoption" program to enable infertile couples to gain access to frozen embryos. Nightlight describes the process as an "adoption" because they match embryo donors with recipients using practices commonly used in traditional adoptions. The U.S. Health and Human Services agency has given grants to Nightlights's Snowflakes program and others to promote "embryo adoption."

Until Stoddart conceived of his program, embryo transfer was typically arranged by medical doctors, but Stoddart hoped positioning the transfer as an adoption would increase the number of embryos implanted in women and brought to term.  The process is considerably less expensive than standard adoption, costing about $9,500.

U.S. Embryo Adoption program 

The U.S. Department of Health and Human Services funded an Embryo Adoption Awareness Campaign beginning in 2002. In 2013 the program had a $1.9 million budget. From 2011 to 2012, the number of embryo adoptions rose 25% in the U.S. As of January, 2013, more than 4500 babies have been born in the U.S. through embryo adoption. A total of about 1,900 babies were born between 2004 and 2009 as a result of the program. Of those, more than 300 have been born since 1997 through Nightlight's Snowflake embryo adoption program. The Obama administration removed funding for the embryo donation awareness program from its budget in 2013 due to "limited interest" from a "very small pool of applicants, many of whom are repeat recipients."

Various studies show that the percentage of frozen embryos that survive after they are unfrozen varies from one-sixth to about three fourths. According to a 2003 study by the American Society for Reproductive Medicine only 2 percent of frozen embryos are actually donated. Other studies have shown that the government grants to improve embryo adoption awareness has led to drastic cuts in the amount Americans are paying for indefinite storage of embryos.

Nightlight donation program 

Nightlight established the first program that organized the adoption of embryo in 1997. It was one of several organizations  that received funding from the Health and Human Services to increase awareness of the opportunity to adopt frozen embryos. Nightlight received a $500,000 grant that it used to produce promotional videos targeting strongly religious, middle-class couples.

The campaign has successfully influenced public opinion: one survey "asked what should be done with remaining embryos. Most respondents said that the embryos should be donated to other infertile couples (68.8 percent) rather than being destroyed (5.9 percent) or being donated for research."<ref>Ron Stoddart, [http://www.christianitytoday.com/ct/2010/july/25.46.html Frozen Embryos:BioTech's Hidden Dilemma], July 28, 2010.</ref>

Those donating embryos through Nightlight's Snowflake program can designate that only Christian families may receive them.  Most embryos have been received by Christian families who pledged to raise the child born in a "constructive, wholesome and spiritual home environment."

Stoddart has worked to publicize the issue of frozen embryos in storage, believing it would increase the number of donations.  In 2005, Stoddart and Lori Maze, the director of the Snowflakes Frozen Embryo Adoption Program, were recognized by President George W. Bush for their work in transferring frozen embryos to infertile couples.  In his biography Decision Points'', President Bush wrote that increasing support for embryo adoption, and specifically Nightlight's Snowflake program, had a profound place in his legacy as president.

Open adoptions 

Asked why a three-day-old blastocyst should be subject to the same adoptive process as a baby, Nightlight Executive Director Daniel Nehrbass said, "We have learnt over the past 100 years that every child not raised by its biological parents will eventually start looking for them, Now we're repeating the mistake with assisted reproduction because we're creating a new set of anonymous parents through sperm and now embryo donation." For this reason Nightlight encourages "open adoption," allowing an adopted child to grow up knowing who its biological parents are. Nightlight believes that an open adoption model gives parents of donor embryos increased confidence in the family adopting their frozen embryos.
The majority of clinics do not offer open embryo donation to their patients or the recipients.

Stem cell lawsuit 
In 2006, President George W. Bush vetoed increased funding for embryonic stem cell research. Three years later, on March 9, 2009, President Barack Obama reversed that decision and issued Executive Order 13505 allowing the research to go forward.   In August 2009, Nightlight, along with two researchers, two potential couples for embryo donation, the embryos themselves, and the Christian Medical Association filed a lawsuit in the D.C. District Court to block the research.  On Oct. 27, 2009, Judge Royce C. Lamberth dismissed the suit, ruling that none of the plaintiffs had standing to bring the case.  On appeal to the D.C. Circuit Court the decision was reversed in part. The two researchers were held to have standing, while Nightlight and the others did not.  On August 23, 2010, Lamberth issued a preliminary injunction against the Federal government conducting stem cell research.

Scientists immediately objected to the ruling, stating that it would do "irreparable harm" to the field. In September 2010, the D.C. Circuit Court temporarily lifted the injunction, finding that the plaintiff was unlikely to prevail at trial.  The scientific community reacted positively, stating that this would allow potentially critical, life-saving research to proceed.  The Coalition for the Advancement of Medical Research, the most vocal advocate of using regenerative medicine to cure disease, said the ruling sent a message that "frivolous" suits against scientific research would not be tolerated. In April 2011, Lamberth's injunction was formally reversed by the U.S. Court of Appeals.

Orphanage work 

Nightlight has partnered with the Heart of a Child agency in Kampala, Uganda, to fund an orphanage for infants. It has organized tours of orphaned youth to the United States where they can meet with prospective adoptive parents. In 1995, they were the first agency to organize a tour for older orphaned Russian children to the United States. They have conducted the tours annually in partnership with Detsky Dom Partners, later renamed Every Child Has a Name, bringing over 500 children from Russia, Ukraine, Kyrgyzstan, and Taiwan to the United States. Nightlight says their goal is to "expose the children to American culture and to raise awareness of the needs of older Russian children" waiting for adoption.

Financial 

During 2011, Nightlight received donations of $712,142 and other revenue totaling $2,119,264.  Their net assets totalled $521,222. Nightlight adheres to the standards of the Evangelical Council on Financial Accountability.

Reviews 

As of January 2014, Nightlight had received an average 3.7 star rating (out of 5) by one website that offers individual reviews of adoption agencies. Some reviews posted by adoptive parents were extremely positive, while others were very negative. The negative reviews in some cases referred to the controversial adoptions previously described, to badly prepared paperwork, and to the sometimes difficult work of placing children from foreign countries with families in the United States. The Better Business Bureau of Colorado and Wyoming in January 2014 had no record of complaints against the company and had insufficient information to provide a rating, while the BBB serving San Diego, Orange and Imperial Counties showed only a single, closed issue with "Problems with Product/Service" during the prior three years.

Footnotes

References 

Christian organizations based in the United States
Adoption in the United States
Adoption-related organizations
Non-profit organizations based in California
Adoption and religion